Baeonoma infamis is a moth in the family Depressariidae. It was described by Edward Meyrick in 1925. It is found in Brazil.

The wingspan is 19–22 mm. The forewings are fuscous and the hindwings are dark grey.

References

Moths described in 1925
Baeonoma
Moths of South America
Taxa named by Edward Meyrick